The 2021–22 Croatian Second Football League (also known as Druga HNL and 2. HNL) was the 31st season of the Croatian Second Football League, the second-level football competition for men's association football teams in Croatia, since its establishment in 1992. The season started on 13 August 2021 and ended on 28 May 2022.

The league was contested by 16 teams, two less than the previous season, and played in a double round robin format, with each team playing every other team twice over 30 rounds. 

At the end of the season, the league will be reduced from 16 to 12 clubs. Reserve teams of first league clubs would not be allowed to play and were automatically moved to a lower rank.

Teams

League table

Results

See also
2021–22 Croatian First Football League

References

External links
Official website

2021-22
Cro
2